Sandy Rivera (born January 18, 1971) is an American house music DJ, record producer and label owner. Born in New York City, he is now based in New Jersey.

Biography
Rivera started his career at age 13 as a DJ in his native Spanish Harlem. He began producing house music in 1992, specializing in a more soulful sound. He has worked under a variety of pseudonyms, including Kings of Tomorrow, Soul Vision and Mysterious People, either alone or with partners Jose Burgos, HAZE and Jay 'Sinister' Sealee (Rivera parted ways with Sealee in 2002). He is the owner of labels BlackWiz (founded 1993) and Deep Vision Records (founded in 1995).

Rivera's best known track is "Finally", released in 2000 under the alias Kings of Tomorrow on Distance Records, with vocals by Julie McKnight, which peaked at number 24 on the UK Singles Chart and at number 17 on the Billboard dance chart, and appeared in a large number of compilations from labels such as  Defected Records, Ministry of Sound, Hed Kandi, and Warner Music. The track is included on K.O.T.'s first album It's in the Lifestyle. The same album also yielded the track "Young Hearts". The vocal version of "Finally" was also used as part of a remixed single by the British act Layo & Bushwacka for their 2003 single "Love Story (vs. Finally)". The second K.O.T. album was released in 2005, titled Trouble. Rivera claimed that the album was his first produced without recourse to samples, and marked the official separation between this and other aliases: Kings of Tomorrow is used for more radio-friendly tracks, while his real name was to be used for club-friendly tracks.

As a producer and remixer, Rivera has worked for a variety of other artists, including veteran jazz musician Terry Callier, Gisele Jackson, Bini & Martini, Michelle Weeks, Ladysmith Black Mambazo and Walter L. Robinson.

Discography

Albums
1998 The Beginning, as Kings of Tomorrow (not a K.O.T. album, includes various tracks produced or remixed by Rivera; the CD version is mixed)
2000 The Calling, as Sandy Rivera & Jose Burgos
2000 It's in the Lifestyle, as Kings of Tomorrow
2000 It's in the Lifestyle - Limited Edition, as Kings of Tomorrow
2001 Kings of Tomorrow Sessions - Mixed by Sandy Rivera
2002 It's in the Lifestyle - The Remixes, as Kings of Tomorrow
2005 Trouble, as Kings of Tomorrow

Singles
Sandy Rivera
1996 The King Size EP
1997 "Come On", with Jon Cutler and Mike Delgado
1997 "Expansions '97/Head Hunters"
1998 "Come into My Room", with Littleton Brown
2001 "Class Is in Session"
2001 "Forever", with John "DNR" Alvarez and Shawnee Taylor
2002 "Changes", with HAZE
2002 "I Can't Stop", with Littleton Brown
2005 "Hope", with Elzi Hall
2005 "Just Won't Do", with Robert Owens
2007 "Freak", with HAZE
2009 "Deeper", with HAZE
2009 "Whatever", with Andy Daniell
2017 "Try a Little Tenderness"

Sandy Rivera & Jose Burgos
All are collaborations with Jose Burgos.
1997 "The Path"
1999 Expanded EP
2000 "12th Street Soul"
2000 "Keep It Coming"
2000 "I Wanna Dance with You", with Karen Workman
2000 "No Smoke"
2001 "Leaving Me"
2001 La Cultura EP

Kings of Tomorrow/K.O.T.
1993 D'Menace EP, with John "DNR" Alvarez
1993 Showcase EP, with George Rivera
1993 "Go Black Scatt", with George Rivera
1994 "Abstract Collage"
1994 Black Sinister Science EP, with Jay 'Sinister' Sealee and Stacey Alexander
1995 "I'm So Grateful", with Densaid
1996 "10 Minute High", with Jay 'Sinister' Sealee and Michelle Weeks
1996 "Fade II Black", with Jay 'Sinister' Sealee
1996 "Open Your Mind/K.O.T. Anthem", with Jay 'Sinister' Sealee
1997 "Set My Spirit Free", with Dawn Tallman
1997 "Ancestors", with Jay 'Sinister' Sealee
1997 Witness Protection EP
1997 "The Session"
1997 "Organic Warfare", with Jay 'Sinister' Sealee
1998 "I Want You (For Myself)", with Jay 'Sinister' Sealee and Julie McKnight
1998 "Let It Go", with Dawn Tallman
1998 The Blackwiz EP
1998 The K.O.T. Invasion EP, with Jay 'Sinister' Sealee
1999 "My Love Is Real", with Jay 'Sinister' Sealee
2000 Going Back to Blackwiz EP, with Jose Burgos and Jay 'Sinister' Sealee
2000 "In the Night", with Littleton Brown
2000 "Finally", with Jay 'Sinister' Sealee and Julie McKnight
2000 "Tear It Up", with Jay 'Sinister' Sealee and Julie McKnight
2001 "Class Is in Session"
2002 "Young Hearts", with Treasa Fennie
2003 "Dreams/Thru", with HAZE and George Rivera
2004 "Dreams", with HAZE
2004 "So Alive"
2005 "Another Day", with Leedia Urtega
2005 "Thru", with HAZE
2005 "6PM", with Nina Lares
2008 "Can't Stop", with Rae
2011 "Take Me Back", with April
2011 "I Need to Love Me", with April
2012 "Show Me", with Elzi Hall
2013 "Fall for You" with April
2016 "Kaoz"
2016 "Closer" with Alex Mills
2016 "Please" with Random Soul
2018 "Faded" with Kandace Springs

Soul Vision
All are collaborations with Jose Burgos.
1998 "Don't Stop", with Littleton Brown
1999 "Low Down", with Jaquito May Perkins
2000 "Don't Hold Back", with Dihann Moore
2000 "Tracey in My Room", as EBTG vs. Soul Vision (official mash-up produced by Ben Watt)
2001 "You've Been on My Mind", with D'Layna

Mysterious People
 All are collaborations with Jay 'Sinister' Sealee.
1996 "Love Revolution"
1997 The Rude Movements EP
1998 "Fly Away"

D'Menace
1997 "Spirit in My Soul"
1997 "Ya-Yahoo!"
1998 "Deep Menace (Spank)"

Other aliases
1992 "Right Now/Break the Ice", as Awesome Foursome, with George Rivera, Wilson X. Yepez and Víctor "Overdose" Sánchez
1994 "The K.O.T. Theory of Rhythmic Seduction", as Kidz of Tomorrow, with Jose Burgos
1995 "The Blackwiz", as Ancestors, with Treasa Fennie
2000 "Free Call", as Delicious Inc meets Sandy Rivera, with Jamie Lewis and Littleton Brown
2000 "Scream & Shout", as The Committee, with Jose Burgos, Jay 'Sinister' Sealee and Kim Armstrong
2001 "Life", as Auréi
2001 "Let the Reign Begin", as Organized Noize, with John "DNR" Alvarez
2001 "I am the Drum", as Organized Noize, with Chris "Ludikris" Conway
2002 Keep Flowing EP, as Sanjose, with Jose Burgos
2003 "Moodbangers", as Moodbangers
2004 "Midnight Express", as Moodbangers, with John Alvarez

(Co-)productions for other artists
1993 Trique-Dik-Slik - "Euphoria (Mary Jane Too)", with Jay 'Sinister' Sealée and Eric Priest
1995 Michelle Wilson- "Lifted Higher"
1995 Sabrynaah Pope - "Shelter"
1995 Big O - "Shmoov wit da Ruffness"
1996 Sean Grant - "I Hear My Calling", with Jay 'Sinister' Sealée
1996 Sean Grant - "Keep On Pressing", with Jay 'Sinister' Sealée
1997 Gisele Jackson - "Happy Feelings"
1997 Julie McKnight - "Rock Steady", Jay 'Sinister' Sealée
1997 Big Foot - "Black Lagoons"
2003 GR-69 - "Trouble"
2007 DADA - "Lollipop", with Trix - #18 UK
2014 Ivy Queen - "Cuando Las Mujeres" (Remix)

References

External links
Official website
Sandy Rivera fan page

Living people
Year of birth missing (living people)
People from East Harlem
Club DJs
DJs from New York City
Remixers
American DJs
American dance musicians
American house musicians
Electronic dance music DJs